Rahimabad (also Romanized as Raḩīmābād) is a village in Kavirat Rural District, Chatrud District, Kerman County, Kerman Province, Iran. At the 2006 census, its population was 2,013, in 446 families.

References 

Populated places in Kerman County